San Onofre State Beach (San Onofre, Spanish for "St. Onuphrius") is a  state park in San Diego County, California. The state park is leased to the state of California by the United States Marine Corps. Governor Ronald Reagan established San Onofre State Beach in 1971. With over 2.5 million visitors per year, it is one of the five most-visited state parks in California, hosting swimmers, campers, kayakers, birders, fishermen, bicyclists, sunbathers, surfers, and the sacred Native American site of Panhe.

History
Panhe at San Onofre is an Acjachemen village that is over 8,000 years old and a current sacred, ceremonial, cultural, and burial site for the Acjachemen people. Many Acjachemen people trace their lineage back to Panhe. It is the site of the first baptism in California, and in 1769 saw the first close contact between Spanish explorers, Catholic missionaries, and the Acjachemen people. The United Coalition to Protect Panhe and The City Project advocate for the preservation of the site. In keeping with the Padres’ tradition of naming areas after patron saints, this area was named after the obscure 4th-century Egyptian, St. Onuphrius.

On November 10, 2016, the Transportation Corridor Agency abandoned plans to build a six-lane toll highway through San Onofre State Beach, other nearby sensitive environmental areas, and certain Native American cultural sites. The announcement brings to an end more than 10 years of effort to build through these areas. The abandonment of this route for the toll road was part of an agreement ending several lawsuits filed by the California attorney general and a coalition of environmental groups that sought to block the project.

Park attractions

The San Onofre Bluffs portion of San Onofre State Beach features  of sandy beaches with six access trails cut into the bluff above. The campground is along the old U.S. Route 101 adjacent to the sandstone bluffs. San Onofre includes San Onofre Bluffs and Beach areas; San Onofre Surf Beach, a day-use facility; San Mateo campgrounds and day-use facility; and Trestles, accessible via a nature trail from San Mateo Campgrounds. Alcohol is banned from all beaches within the park.

The park includes a marshy area where San Mateo Creek meets the shoreline and Trestles, a surfing site. Whales, dolphins, and sea lions can be seen offshore. The park’s coastal terrace is chaparral-covered.

Surfing

A surfing and fishing camp had been there since the 1920s, before the U.S. government established Camp Pendleton, a U.S. Marine training camp during World War II. Surfers using redwood boards have visited San Onofre since at least the 1940s, including Lorrin "Whitey" Harrison, Don Okey, Al Dowden, Tom Wilson, and Bob Simmons.

San Onofre has several surf breaks on its  of coast:
 Trestles, a world-famous surfing area known for its consistent waves
 Church, near Camp Pendleton’s beach resort, provides sunbathing and duck watching
 Surf Beach, divided into three breaks spots known as The Point, Old Man’s, and Dogpatch
 Trails, the southernmost surf spot in this region, includes both rock bottom and sandy breaks

Former nude beach
Nudity is prohibited at all parts of San Onofre State Beach, A traditional "clothing optional area" was formerly at the extreme south end of San Onofre Bluffs beach, accessed via Trail number 6. Since March 2010, park rangers have been citing park visitors for nudity, following the 2009 defeat of a legal challenge by a nudist group.

Nuclear station
Between San Onofre Bluffs and San Onofre Surf Beach is the San Onofre Nuclear Generating Station (SONGS), which was shut down in June 2013.

In popular culture

 "San Onofre" and "Trestles" are both mentioned in the 1963 Beach Boys' song Surfin' U.S.A.

See also
List of beaches in California
List of California state parks

References

External links
 official San Onofre State Beach website
 
 San Onofre Beach News and Recreation
 Surf Shop located at San Onofre 
 Aerial Video of San Onofre Beach and campground

Beaches of Southern California
California State Beaches
Parks in San Diego County, California
Surfing locations in California
Archaeological sites in California
Nude beaches
Beaches of San Diego County, California